The Family Viewing Hour was a policy established by the Federal Communications Commission (FCC) in the United States in 1975. Under the policy, each television network in the U.S. had a responsibility to air "family-friendly" programming during the first hour of the prime time lineup (8 to 9 p.m. Eastern Time). The hour disappeared in 1977 after the policy was overturned in court; however, the concept has continued to be used by some viewers who still believe that the 8:00 p.m. time slot in primetime has an obligation to have family-friendly programming.

Background 

In 1974, there was widespread public criticism regarding the amount of sex and violence then on American television. Although there are several examples, there was one television scene that caused a particularly strong backlash. The 1974 NBC television movie Born Innocent featured a lesbian rape scene, and was even briefly shown in daytime promotional spots for the film. The scene drew much outcry upon its first airing and was blamed for the real-life rape of a young girl, which led to a case before the California Supreme Court.

In January 1975, then-FCC chairman Richard E. Wiley addressed the Senate and House Communications and Commerce Subcommittees, stating that all three networks agreed to adopt a "family viewing hour" in response to the criticism. The National Association of Broadcasters took the gesture one step further, decreeing that local stations also air family friendly programming in the 7 p.m. time slot, a time that networks were forbidden from programming under the Prime Time Access Rule and were thus up to the individual stations to program.

The president of CBS at the time wanted to go through with the measure but would only agree if NBC and ABC consented, citing a possible decline in ratings (the network had been #1 in U.S. households since the mid-1950s) if they were the only network to try the new policy. By the end of 1974, each network executive agreed to endorse the Family Viewing Hour, and to implement it by the fall 1975 season.

Indeed, many television series suffered from the Family Viewing Hour mandate. All in the Family, which was the runaway top-rated show in the U.S. since 1971, was moved to 9 p.m. on Mondays after five seasons leading the Saturday night lineup. Producer Norman Lear, citing an infringement on creative freedom and on his First Amendment rights, mounted a lawsuit. With the support of varying guilds, including the WGA, he won the case. The show's cast responded by recording a satirical, never-aired rendition of the show's theme song, retitled "These Are the Days".

On November 4, 1976, United States district court Judge Warren J. Ferguson declared the Family Viewing Hour unconstitutional. Ferguson stated while the idea was good in theory, the FCC had overstepped its bounds in having it instituted; the FCC privately lobbied the three major networks to adopt the policy instead of holding public hearings on the matter, and Ferguson ruled on those grounds that the Family Viewing Hour had no binding merit. The decree made by the National Association of Broadcasters in 1975 was also overturned, ruling that the NAB had made the decree under duress; the ruling thus gave stations free rein on what to air in the pre-prime time slots.

Use of the concept today 

After the Family Viewing Hour was declared unconstitutional, the networks continued voluntarily to offer family-friendly programs such as The Cosby Show and Happy Days in the early primetime hours, so some families still believed in the concept. Due to this point of view, in 1989, Michigan housewife Terry Rakolta started a highly public letter-writing campaign to persuade advertisers to stop sponsoring the Fox network sitcom Married... with Children after watching the episode "Her Cups Runneth Over" with her three youngest children. Consequently, two companies completely withdrew sponsorship from the show, while other companies, including The Coca-Cola Company, simply reduced sponsorship. Starting in the 2000-2001 season, ABC stopped showing commercials for R-rated films during the first hour of primetime. In 2003, The New York Times reported that FCC commissioner Kevin Martin called to bring back the Family Hour.

In 2001, the Parents Television Council (PTC) campaigned for the FCC to reuse the Family Hour voluntarily following its report The Sour Family Hour. Over the years, the PTC has run numerous reports claiming that the so-called "Family Hour" of 8:00 p.m. (7:00 p.m. in Central and Mountain Time Zones) is becoming more unsuitable for family viewing, having released a report in September 2007.

Bernard Goldberg and Zell Miller have used the term "family hour" in their books to describe the early primetime hours as well.

The advent of streaming television has rendered the concept of a strictly defined "family hour" difficult to enforce, given that the technology provides consumers with the ability to view adult-themed programming (including sexual content, violence and language that far exceeds what has ever been allowed on commercial broadcast television) at any time of the day.

References 

1975 establishments in the United States
1977 disestablishments in the United States
Federal Communications Commission
Television terminology
1975 neologisms